Þórshöfn or Thorshofn is a small fishing village in northeast Iceland, located on the northern coast of the Langanes peninsula on the Þistilfjörður bay.

The village has a population of 380 people. It is the administrative centre of Langanesbyggð municipality and of the neighbouring Svalbarðshreppur municipality. In Þórshöfn there is a year-round service to tourists, and Icelandair connects the village to Akureyri and Reykjavík with seasonal flights from Þórshöfn Airport.

Þórshöfn is also the Icelandic name of Tórshavn (capital of the Faroe Islands).

Climate
The climate is arctic (Koppen: ET) with cold winters and cool summers.

Sights 
Sauðanes, a farm about seven kilometres north of Þórshöfn on Langanes peninsula, has a church built in 1889 and a parsonage (Sauðaneshús) dating from 1879 which was the first stone building in the Northeastern part of Iceland. The church doors were made of driftwood, and the winged altarpiece dates from 1742. The pulpit was created in the 18th century as well. The parsonage was renovated from 1991 to 2003 and transformed into a museum.

References

External links
 Official website
 Travelguide 

Populated places in Northeastern Region (Iceland)
Fishing communities
Fishing communities in Iceland